Yowrqanlu (also Romanized as Yowrqānlū; also known as Yowrghānlū) is a village in Rowzeh Chay Rural District, in the Central District of Urmia County, West Azerbaijan Province, Iran. At the 2006 census, its population was 291, in 75 families.

References 

Populated places in Urmia County